Valley Falls is a small unincorporated community in Lake County, Oregon, United States.  The settled area is located at the junction of U.S. Route 395 and Oregon Route 31.  The community is named for a small falls on the Chewaucan River just north of the occupied site.  East of Valley Falls, the cliff face of Abert Rim overlooks the community.

History 

The area around Valley Falls was occupied by Native Americans for up to 11,000 years prior to the arrival of white settlers.  Archaeological evidence shows that the peak period for use by native tribes was between 2,000 and 500 years ago.  During that period, the people who lived in the Valley Falls area were probably ancestors of the Klamath and Modoc peoples. Most of these Native Americans lived in pit-houses along the shore of Abert Lake, just north of Valley Falls.  There are also a number of ancient petroglyphs near Valley Falls.  The Abert Lake Petroglyphs, at the foot of Abert Rim, are thought to be over 10,000 years old.

In 1832, John Work led his Hudson's Bay Company trapping brigade through the Valley Falls area.  Work recorded the visit in his journal.  In 1843, Captain John C. Fremont explored the area around Valley Falls.  Fremont name Abert Rim and nearby Abert Lake after the head of the United States Army's topographical engineers, Colonel John J. Abert.

The community was founded and named by C. W. E. Jennings, who opened a store at the site around 1908. In 1909, a post office was established at Valley Falls. The office was located near the base of Abert Rim. The first postmaster was Ernest L.H. Meyer. However, Jennings later took over from Meyer. At its peak, the community of Valley Falls had a hotel, livery stable, and a dance hall in addition to the Jennings' store and post office. The area was surveyed for a railroad, but it was never built. In 1942, the post office was moved approximately one mile west to the junction of U.S. Route 395 and Oregon Route 31. The Valley Falls post office was closed in 1943.

Geography 

The unincorporated community of Valley Falls is located at the junction of U.S. Route 395 and Oregon Route 31 in the high desert country of Lake County in south-central Oregon. There are only five structures at the site. The main business is a combined gas station and store, located on the west side of the highway, south of the junction. There is also a recreational vehicle park and a guest ranch nearby.

Geology 

  Abert Rim is approximately one mile east of Valley Falls. The top  is a sheer-cliff. The rim is basalt, formed by large lava flows during the Miocene epoch. After the lava flows stopped, large blocks faults broke and tilted the land. Abert Rim is the result of one of those giant faults.

From Valley Falls, visitors have an unobstructed view of Abert Rim's cliff face. Along the highway just south of the Valley Falls, there is an Outback Scenic Byway kiosk that explains how Abert Rim was formed.  There are also two geological information signs north of Valley Falls, one on Route 395 and the other on Route 31.

Climate 

January is normally the coldest month, averaging .

The area around Valley Falls is typical of Oregon's high desert country. The area's highest average precipitation comes between October and June, usually as the result of thunderstorms. From November to March most of the area's precipitation comes in the form of snow.

Demographics 

The United States Geological Survey identifies Valley Falls as a "populated place".  That is "a place or area with clustered or scattered buildings and a permanent human population. A populated place is usually not incorporated and by definition has no legal boundaries."  United States Census data are not available for Valley Falls.  The Valley Falls area is part of the Summer Lake Census County Division, but specific census data for the community are not presented in 2010 census reports.

Local points of interest 

 Abert Rim
 Abert Lake
 Abert Lake Petroglyphs (listed on National Register of Historic Places)
 Chandler State Wayside
 Chewaucan River
 Oregon Outback Byway

See also 
 List of cities and unincorporated communities in Oregon

References

External links 

 Lake County, Oregon

Unincorporated communities in Lake County, Oregon
Unincorporated communities in Oregon
Populated places established in 1908
1908 establishments in Oregon